The World of Aden is a 1995 role-playing game supplement published by West End Games for MasterBook.

Contents
The World of Aden is a setting designed for use with West End Games' Masterbook and D6 systems, and is based on a background developed by SSI and used in two PC games, Thunderscape and Entomorph. Shane Lacy Hensley wrote the world book, which was later converted into a tabletop roleplaying game by West End Games. When SSI sold off its assets, the World of Aden was not included. Shane Hensley received an official transfer of the intellectual property from the former president of SSI, and eventually sold it to Kyoudai Games, who publishes the current version of the tabletop RPG (as of February 2022).

Publication history
Shannon Appelcline commented that "The World of Bloodshadows (1994), a noir fantasy, was West End's only original setting for MasterBook; everything else was licensed. The World of Indiana Jones (1994) and The World of Necroscope (1995) might have been good licenses. However, the same can't be said of The World of Aden (1996), The World of Species (1995), The World of Tales from the Crypt (1996), or infamously The World of Tank Girl (1995).

Reception
Andy Butcher reviewed The World of Aden for Arcane magazine, rating it a 6 out of 10 overall. Butcher comments that "Unfortunately, while the book succeeds at sketching out the basics of the world, it rarely finds the space to go into detail. There are a lot of good ideas here, and an inventive referee looking for a slightly different setting could do a lot worse than to pick this up, whether you're familiar with the Masterbook and D6 systems or not."

Reviews
Arcane (Issue 16 - Feb 1997)

References

Masterbook system
Role-playing game books
Role-playing game supplements introduced in 1995
Steampunk role-playing games
West End Games games